Waljat College of Applied Sciences (WCAS) is one of Oman's leading higher education institutes. It was established in October 2001 by H.E. Dr. Omar Bin Abdul Muniem Al Zawawi in academic partnership with Birla Institute of Technology (BIT, Mesra), India, one of India's premier universities. It is the second International Centre of BIT, Mesra. It provides education in the specialized branches of Engineering, Information Technology and Business Administration.

Location
WCAS is located in the premises of Knowledge Oasis at Rusayl, a suburb of Muscat,
the capital city of Oman. It enjoys the locational advantage of being close to companies like Microsoft, Oracle Corporation, Motorola etc.

Affiliating University

WCAS used to offer degree programs of Birla Institute of Technology, Mesra (BIT, Mesra), India. The course curriculum and the teaching, learning process are exactly similar to that of BIT, Mesra. BIT was established by philanthropist industrialist Mr. B.M. Birla in 1955 at Ranchi, the industrial centre of India. BIT is a full member of the Association of Commonwealth Universities. It was conferred Deemed University status in 1986 due to the achievements of the Institute, both in terms of research and excellent standards of academic programmes. The Institute has been accredited by the National Assessment & Accreditation Council (NAAC) & the National Board of Accreditation (NBA) established by the UGC & AICTE respectively. BIT has consistently been ranked among top institutes in India in the field of Engineering by leading Indian publications like India Today, Outlook, Dataquest India, Mint etc. In 2018 due to a decision from the honorable Indian supreme court BIT Mesra withdrew its affiliation from Waljat.

Infrastructure and Facilities
All the facilities provided by WCAS are as per the norms laid down in the Criteria for Private Colleges recommended by the Ministry of Higher Education, Sultanate of Oman. The buildings of the college are spread over four blocks; Dean's Office, Department of Computer Science and Department of Electronics & Communication Engineering are located in Block I; Department of Management, Department of English and Library are located in Block II; The Admin & HR, Finance Department, Admission & Registration Department, IT Manager, Video Conference Facility, Medical Room are located in Block III, The Department of Biotechnology and Workshop are in Block IV.Besides this the college has Auditorium, Multipurpose hall, a canteen, language Lab., e-learning facility, computer lab and well equipped laboratory facilities. Ample car parking facility is available.

Academic programs
Waljat College of Applied Sciences offers following degree programs of BIT, Mesra:

 Master of Business Administration (MBA)
 Executive Master of Business Administration (EMBA) - Part Time
 Bachelor of Engineering (BE)
 Biotechnology
 Computer Science & Engineering
 Electronics & Communications Engineering
 Bachelor of Computer Applications (BCA)
 Bachelor of Business Administration (BBA)

BBA and BCA programs are also offered in part-time mode for working people.
Following Diploma, and Advanced Diploma programs are also available as exit routes to the above-mentioned degree programs :
 Diploma in Electronics and Communication / Computer Science / Computer Application / Business Administration.
 Advanced Diploma in Electronics and Communication / Computer Science.
Based on the performance at the entrance evaluation tests for BE/BBA/BCA, students can get admitted to one year foundation program, where they will be taught subjects so that they come up to the entry level of the respective graduate degree.

Admissions
Admission process normally starts from the month of May every year by way of announcing in leading news papers of Oman.
 BE : On the basis of the entrance evaluation test conducted by WCAS in Muscat or CBSE-AIEEE examination score OR SAT -II Score.
 BBA/BCA :  On the basis of the entrance evaluation test conducted by WCAS in Muscat.

Training & Placement
Training & Placement Cell functions in the college with the aim of providing career counseling and placement opportunities to graduating students through campus recruitment in different private and public companies. Career Fair is organised every year to give an opportunity to students to interact with companies.
The students of the final year can participate in campus interviews both at the Mesra campus in India of the Birla Institute of Technology, and at their own campus of WCAS, Muscat. Students have been successful in getting employment. Many local companies have evinced interest in hiring WCAS students.

See also
 Birla Institute of Technology, Mesra
 Birla Institute of Technology International Centre
 Birla Institute of Technology – Science and Technology Entrepreneurs' Park

Notes

External links
 Official Website
 Birla Institute of Technology, Mesra, India

Colleges in Oman
Buildings and structures in Muscat, Oman
Birla Institute of Technology